is a Japanese mixed martial artist who competes in the welterweight division. He is also a former boxer who competed in the light heavyweight division.

Mixed martial arts career
Miura earned a WEC title fight against WEC Welterweight Champion Carlos Condit at WEC 35 on August 3, 2008. As the Japan boxing commission established four weight divisions in September 2009, Miura turned to boxing. After falling in love with his boxing training, Miura has embarked on a professional boxing career and put his mixed martial arts career on hold.

Return to MMA
In 2015, Miura returned to mixed martial arts. He became the Welterweight King of Pancrase after defeating Akihiro Murayama via unanimous decision at Pancrase 281 on October 2, 2016.

On July 2, 2017, Miura attempted to defend his title against Daichi Abe at Pancrase 288. He lost the fight and the championship via second-round technical knockout.

In the first fight after losing his title, Miura faced Gota Yamashita at Pancrase 309 On October 20, 2019. He won the fight via first-round technical knockout.

Miura then faced Masayuki Kikuiri at Pancrase 322 on July 27, 2021. Miura lost the bout via second-round technical knockout.

Professional boxing career
Miura made his professional boxing debut at the Hard Rock Hotel and Casino, Las Vegas, on April 10, 2010. Then, fighting in Los Angeles, Tokyo and Las Vegas, he beat undefeated Todd Manuel at the Cosmopolitan of Las Vegas on March 25, 2011. Miura successively won over the previously undefeated fellow boxer Shintarō Matsumoto in an eight round bout at the 170 pound (77 kg) limit at the Korakuen Hall in Tokyo on August 6 of the same year. In that month, he was ranked No. 1 in the super middleweight division in Japan. No one but he has been ranked in the newly established four weight divisions yet.

On October 1, 2011, Miura defeated Hector Hernandez via a unanimous decision in a six round super middleweight bout at the MGM Grand Hotel and Casino.

Racking a 9–0 record in the ring, Miura eventually challenged Yuzo Kiyota for the OPBF Super Middleweight title on October 6, 2012. He lost the bout via technical knockout in the sixth round.

Mixed martial arts record

|-
| Loss
| align=center| 13–8
| Masayuki Kikuiri
| TKO (body kick and punches)
| Pancrase 322
| 
| align=center| 2
| align=center| 2:31
| Tokyo, Japan
| 
|-
| Win
| align=center| 13–7
| Gota Yamashita
| TKO (punches)
| Pancrase 309
| 
| align=center| 1
| align=center| 1:08
| Tokyo, Japan
| 
|-
| Loss
| align=center| 12–7
| Daichi Abe
| TKO (punches)
| Pancrase 288 
| 
| align=center| 2
| align=center| 0:26
| Tokyo, Japan
|
|-
| Win
| align=center| 12–6
| Akihiro Murayama
| Decision (unanimous)
| Pancrase 281
| 
| align=center| 5
| align=center| 5:00
| Tokyo, Japan
| 
|-
| Win
| align=center| 11–6
| Yuta Nakamura 
| TKO (punches)
| Pancrase 274
| 
| align=center| 2
| align=center| 3:39
| Tokyo, Japan
| 
|-
| Win
| align=center| 10–6
| Toshikazu Suzuki
| KO (punches)
| Pancrase 271
| 
| align=center| 3
| align=center| 0:48
| Tokyo, Japan
| 
|-
| Loss
| align=center| 9–6
| Edgar García
| KO (punches)
| WEC 38
| 
| align=center| 1
| align=center| 1:18
| San Diego, California, United States
| 
|-
| Loss
| align=center| 9–5
| Carlos Condit
| TKO (punches)
| WEC 35: Condit vs. Miura
| 
| align=center| 4
| align=center| 4:43
| Las Vegas, Nevada, United States
| 
|-
| Win
| align=center| 9–4
| Blas Avena
| KO (punches)
| WEC 33: Marshall vs. Stann
| 
| align=center| 1
| align=center| 2:35
| Las Vegas, Nevada, United States
| 
|-
| Win
| align=center| 8–4
| Fernando Gonzalez
| TKO (submission to punches)
| WEC 29
| 
| align=center| 2
| align=center| 3:35
| Las Vegas, Nevada, United States
| 
|-
| Loss
| align=center| 7–4
| Jason Miller
| Decision (unanimous)
| WEC 27
| 
| align=center| 3
| align=center| 5:00
| Las Vegas, Nevada, United States
| 
|-
| Win
| align=center| 7–3
| Ryo Kakigawa
| TKO (punches)
| Hero's 7
| 
| align=center| 1
| align=center| 1:36
| Yokohama, Kanagawa, Japan
| 
|-
| Win
| align=center| 6–3
| Geovani Pereira
| TKO (punches)
| W-Capsule: Vol. 2
| 
| align=center| 1
| align=center| 2:35
| Tokyo, Japan
| 
|-
| Win
| align=center| 5–3
| Kazuki Okubo
| Decision (unanimous)
| W-Capsule: Vol. 1
| 
| align=center| 3
| align=center| 5:00
| Tokyo, Japan
| 
|-
| Loss
| align=center| 4–3
| Kestutis Smirnovas
| TKO (punches)
| Hero's Lithuania 2005
| 
| align=center| 1
| align=center| 4:30
| Vilnius, Lithuania
| 
|-
| Loss
| align=center| 4–2
| Izuru Takeuchi
| TKO (punches)
| Hero's 2
| 
| align=center| 2
| align=center| 2:35
| Tokyo, Japan
| 
|-
| Win
| align=center| 4–1
| Genki Ideta
| TKO (punches)
| Deep: clubDeep Fukuoka: World Best Festival
| 
| align=center| 1
| align=center| 0:56
| Fukuoka, Japan
| 
|-
| Win
| align=center| 3–1
| Hirohide Fujinuma
| Decision (unanimous)
| Deep: 18th Impact
| 
| align=center| 2
| align=center| 5:00
| Tokyo, Japan
| 
|-
| Win
| align=center| 2–1
| Yun Seob Kwak
| TKO (punches)
| Pancrase: Brave 10
| 
| align=center| 1
| align=center| 0:54
| Chiba, Japan
| 
|-
| Win
| align=center| 1–1
| Yuichi Nakanishi
| Decision (majority)
| Pancrase: Brave 8
| 
| align=center| 2
| align=center| 5:00
| Tokyo, Japan
| 
|-
| Loss
| align=center| 0–1
| Joe D'Arce
| TKO (kick and punches)
| Pancrase: 2004 Neo-Blood Tournament Semifinals
| 
| align=center| 2
| align=center| 4:17
| Tokyo, Japan
|

Professional boxing record

References

External links 

Hirotmitu Miura's boxing record

Living people
1981 births
Japanese male mixed martial artists
Welterweight mixed martial artists
Middleweight mixed martial artists
Mixed martial artists utilizing judo
Mixed martial artists utilizing kickboxing
Mixed martial artists utilizing boxing
Light-heavyweight boxers
Japanese male judoka
Sportspeople from Fukuoka (city)
People from Ukiha, Fukuoka
Japanese male boxers